Oleksandr Yuriyovych Pielieshenko (also transliterated Peleshenko, born January 7, 1994) is a Ukrainian weightlifter. He was the 2016 and 2017 European Champion. He also competed for Ukraine at the 2016 Summer Olympics.

Career
As of April 2018 he was suspended due to an out of competition (OOC) drug test, the test detected a masking agent (Chlorthalidone) and he is suspended provisionally until 2026.

Major results

References

External links
 
 
 
 
 

Ukrainian male weightlifters
1994 births
Living people
Weightlifters at the 2016 Summer Olympics
Olympic weightlifters of Ukraine
Doping cases in weightlifting
Ukrainian sportspeople in doping cases
European Weightlifting Championships medalists
20th-century Ukrainian people
21st-century Ukrainian people